Matthew Joseph Incigneri (1 February 1891 – 24 October 1960)was an Australian rules footballer who played with Richmond and Melbourne in the Victorian Football League (VFL).

He was the brother of Len Incigneri who also played in the VFL.

Notes

External links 

Matt Incigneri at DemonWiki

1891 births
1960 deaths
Australian rules footballers from Victoria (Australia)
Richmond Football Club players
Melbourne Football Club players
People from Hastings, Victoria